A number of Palmerston Forts were built along the south coast of England on recommendation of the 1860 Royal Commission on the Defence of the United Kingdom. As well as new structure, many existing defences were improved. Most were clustered around major ports, such as:

Dover
Isle of Wight
Plymouth
Portland Harbour
Portsmouth

However, some more isolated works did take place at:

Hurst Castle, Hampshire
Littlehampton Redoubt, Littlehampton, West Sussex
Newhaven Fort, Newhaven
Shoreham Redoubt, Shoreham-by-Sea, West Sussex

South coast